= 1. FCK =

1. FCK is an abbreviation for the following German sports clubs:

- 1. FC Kaiserslautern, a German association football club based in Kaiserslautern, Rhineland-Palatinate
- 1. FC Köln, a German association football club based in Cologne, North Rhine-Westphalia
